Montefiore, Montifiore, and Montefiori is a surname associated with the Montefiore family, Sephardi Jews who were diplomats and bankers all over Europe and who originated from the Iberian Peninsula, namely Spain and Portugal, and also France, Morocco, England, and Italy. Meaning "flower mountain", its Ashkenazi equivalent would be "Blumberg" or "Bloomberg". Notable people with the surname include:

People 
 Adam Montefiore (born 1957), British-born Israeli wine trade veteran and wine critic
 Alan Montefiore (born 1926), British philosopher and Emeritus Fellow of Balliol College, Oxford
 Albert Montefiore Hyamson (1875–1954), British civil servant and historian, chief immigration officer in British Palestine 1921–1934
 Claude Montefiore (1858–1938), philosopher
 Dora Montefiore (1851–1933), English-Australian women's suffragist, socialist, poet, and autobiographer
 Eliezer Levi Montefiore, businessman and art collector in Melbourne and Adelaide (nephew of Jacob and Joseph Barrow) 
 Fausto Montefiore (1906–not known), Italian boxer
 Georges Montefiore-Levi (1832–1906), Belgian politician, inventor and philanthropist
 Hugh Sebag-Montefiore (born 1955), author, attorney, and journalist 
 Hugh Montefiore (1920–2005), bishop of Birmingham 1977–1987 and environmentalist (born Hugh Sebag-Montefiore)
 Jacob Barrow Montefiore (1801–1895), Colonial Commissioner for South Australia resident in London (brother of Joseph Barrow, cousin to Sir Moses)
 Jacob Levi Montefiore (1819–1885), Australian politician (brother of Eliezer Levi, nephew of Jacob and Joseph Barrow)
 John Israel Montefiore (1807–1898), New Zealand trader and merchant
 Joseph Barrow Montefiore (1803–1893), merchant and financier in the Australian colonies (brother of Jacob Barrow, cousin to Sir Moses)
 Joseph Sebag-Montefiore (1822–1903) financier
 Judith Montefiore (1786–1862), British linguist, musician, and philanthropist, wife of Sir Moses
 Sir Moses Montefiore (1784–1885), prominent British financier, stockbroker, banker and philanthropist, husband of Judith
 Moses Eliezer Montefiore (born 1798?), probably brother of Jacob and Joseph Barrow
 Leonard A. Montefiore (1853–1879), British author and philanthropist
 Leonard G. Montefiore (1889–1961), Anglo-Jewish community leader and philanthropist
 Karlo Montefiore Gordeziani (1938–2005), Professor of Physics at Tbilisi State University, Georgia
 Santa Montefiore (born 1970), British author
 Simon Sebag Montefiore (born 1965), British historian and author

Places 
 Montefiore, a neighborhood in Tel Aviv, north of the Central Station
 Montefiore Conca, a municipality in the Province of Rimini, Italy
 Montefiore dell'Aso, a municipality in the Province of Ascoli Piceno in Italy 
 Montefiore Hill, small hill with lookout and memorial in North Adelaide, South Australia, and named after Jacob Barrow Montefiore
 Montefiore Road, continuation of Morphett Street, Adelaide which leads up to Montefiore Hill

Hospitals
 Montefiore Medical Center, teaching hospital of the Albert Einstein College of Medicine, located in the Norwood section of the Bronx
 Montefiore New Rochelle Hospital, a teaching hospital in New Rochelle, New York
 Sir Moses Montefiore Jewish Home, residential elderly care facilities in Hunters Hill and Woollahra
 The Montefiore Hospital in Hove, United Kingdom
 UPMC Montefiore, part of University of Pittsburgh Medical Center in Pittsburgh, Pennsylvania, United States

Schools
 Montefiore Residency Program in Social Medicine, one of the oldest primary care training programs in the U.S., active in Bronx
 Moses Montefiore Academy, special school of the Chicago Public Schools (CPS) for students with severe emotional disorders
 Montefiore House, Wessex Lane Halls of the University of Southampton
 The Montefiore Institute, the EECS département of the University of Liège

Synagogues
 B'nai Israel Synagogue and Montefiore Cemetery, in Grand Forks, North Dakota
 Congregation Montefiore Synagogue, historic synagogue in downtown Salt Lake City, Utah
 Montefiore Cemetery, Jewish cemetery in St. Albans, Queens, New York
 Moses Montefiore Congregation, synagogue in Bloomington, Illinois
 Montefiore Synagogue the former private synagogue of Sir Moses Montefiore, an 1833, Grade II* listed building in Ramsgate, Kent, England

Other
 Montefiore Club, a private social and business association, catering to the Jewish community, located in Montreal, Quebec, Canada
 Montefiore Windmill, a landmark windmill in Jerusalem, Israel

See also
 782 Montefiore, minor planet orbiting the Sun
 Montefiore Hospital (disambiguation)

References

Italian-language surnames